Qinpu are tablature score collections for the Chinese musical instrument, the guqin.

What are qinpu?
Qinpu are collections of tablatures of music for the guqin. In the past, music was passed on from teacher to student. Only recently has tablature been written down, often to preserve music or as a reference book. Tablature comes in form of individual and collections. Collections often have additional material attached to them, like explanation of fingering, qin lore, music theory, etc.

Different types of qinpu
There are several different types of qinpu one can obtain: original editions, photographic reprint, lithographic facsimiles and modern reset editions.

Original editions are qinpu printed at the original time of publication, or re-issues during the past. These are mostly kept in libraries and private collections. Since they are original, they tend to be fragile.

Photographic reprints is basically a scan of the original qinpu and reduced size reprint in modern binding. The most famous is the Qinqu Jicheng.

Lithographic facsimiles are becoming more popular. The original qinpu is scanned, then it is lithographically printed on xuan paper. They are bound in traditional Chinese book binding method. 

Modern reset editions appeared after 2005. These have modern typographic elements and are often reset using more recent editions or handcopies of original qinpu.

See also
Qin notation

References
Please see: References section in the guqin article for a full list of references used in all qin related articles.

Zha, Fuxi (1958). Cunjian Guqin Qupu Jilan 【存見古琴曲譜輯覽】. Beijing: The People's Music Press. . 
Christopher Evan's site Zha Fuxi's list of tablature collections in pinyin alphabetical order.
John Thompson: Guqin Handbooks A chronological list with more detailed listing and links.

   
    

Musical notation 
Guqin